The 2019 KBS Entertainment Awards presented by Korean Broadcasting System (KBS), took place on December 21, 2019 at KBS New Wing Open Hall in Yeouido-dong, Yeongdeungpo-gu, Seoul. The 1st part was hosted by Jun Hyun-moo, Son Dam-bi and Jang Dong-yoon. During the 2nd part of the show, Jun Hyun-moo was replaced by Kim Jun-hyun.

Nominations and winners

Presenters

Special performances

References

External links 
  
 

Korean Broadcasting System original programming
KBS Entertainment Awards
2019 television awards
2019 in South Korea